Rohan Bopanna and Adam Feeney were the defending champions but Bopanna chose not to compete this year. Feeney instead partnered Andrew Coelho and lost in the quarterfinals to Prakash Amritraj and Aisam-ul-Haq Qureshi.

Amritraj and Qureshi went on to win the title, defeating Jonathan Marray and Frederik Nielsen in the final, 6–3, 7–6(8–6).

Seeds

Draw

Draw

References

External links
 Main Draw (ATP)
 Official ATP

Irish Open